Lóránt Kovács (born 6 June 1993) is a Romanian professional footballer of Hungarian ethnicity who plays as a midfielder for Romanian club FK Csíkszereda.

Career
Born in Târgu Mureș, Romania, Kovács started playing football in his hometown. Later he moved to Cluj-Napoca at Ardealul Cluj and in 2010 he joined Universitatea Cluj together with other teammates. In 2012, he was loaned to the lower division team CSM Metalul Reșița but at the end of the year, he returned to Universitatea Cluj.

Kovács made his debut in Liga I in May 2013, in a match against FC Rapid București. He joined Haladás in January 2016.

Club statistics

References

External links

1993 births
Living people
Sportspeople from Târgu Mureș
Romanian footballers
Romanian sportspeople of Hungarian descent
Association football midfielders
FC Universitatea Cluj players
CS Sportul Snagov players
Szombathelyi Haladás footballers
Újpest FC players
Sepsi OSK Sfântu Gheorghe players
Liga I players
Liga II players
Nemzeti Bajnokság I players